Joint Entrance Screening Test is a screening test in India conducted to shortlist candidates for admission to MSc, Integrated PhD and PhD programmes in Physics, Theoretical Computer Science, Neuroscience and Computational Biology at twenty public research institutes.
/
Eligibility
Please see the websites/advertisements of the participating institutes for their eligibility criteria in details.
Listed below are tentative eligibility criteria of admission to M.Sc., Ph.D., and Integrated / M.Sc. / M.Tech. - Ph.D. programs in the participating institutes.
Ph.D. Programme
Physics

M.Sc. in physics (all participating Institutes).
Additionally, some institutes accept B.E. / B.Tech. / M.Sc. / M.E. / M.Tech. in disciplines of Applied Physics and Mathematics, as listed below.

M.Sc. in Mathematics / Applied Physics / Applied Mathematics / Optics and Photonics / Instrumentation / Electronics will also be considered at IIA.
B.E. or B.Tech. will be considered at IISc, IMSc, ICTS-TIFR, IUCAA, JNCASR, NCRA-TIFR, TIFR-TCIS, RRI, IISER Mohali, IISER Pune, IISER Thiruvananthapuram.
M.Sc. in Physics / Electronics / Astronomy / Applied Mathematics will be considered at IUCAA.
M.Sc. in physics, Engineering Physics or Applied Physics will also be considered at IPR.
M.Sc. in physics, Chemistry, Applied Mathematics, Biophysics or Biochemistry will be considered at SNBNCBS.
B.Tech. Eng. Phys.will be considered at TIFR.
M.E./ M.Tech. in Applied Physics  will be considered at NISER.
Theoretical Computer Science at IMSc

M.Sc./ M.E. / M.Tech. in Computer Science and related disciplines, and should be interested in the mathematical aspects of computer science.

Ph D in Neuroscience at NBRC

M.Sc. (Physics/ Mathematics), B.E/ B.Tech/ M.C.A in Computer Science
Ph D in Computational Biology at IMSc

M.Sc./ M.E. / M.Tech. / MCA  in any engineering or science discipline, with good mathematical skills and strong interest in biological problems.
Integrated M.Sc. / M.Tech. - Ph.D. Programme (Physics)

B.Sc. (Physics / Mathematics) will be considered at SNBNCBS.
B.Sc. (Physics) will be considered at IMSc.
B.Sc. (Physics / Mathematics) / B.E. / B.Tech. in Electrical / Instrumentation / Engineering Physics / Electronics and Communications / Computer Science and Engineering / Optics and Photonics will be considered in IIA.
B.Sc. (Physics) or B.E./B. Tech in Engineering Physics, with a minimum of first class marks, will be considered at NISER.
B.Sc. (Physics) will be considered at IISER-Pune, ICTS-TIFR, NCRA-TIFR, and TIFR-TCIS.
B.Sc. (Physics / Mathematics) / B.E. / B.Tec. will be considered for Integrated M.Sc. - PhD at Bose Institute.
Integrated Ph.D. Programme in Theoretical Computer Science at IMSc

B.Sc./B.E./B.Tech./M.C.A. in Computer Science or related disciplines and should be interested in the mathematical aspects of computer science.
Integrated M.Tech. - Ph.D. Programme at IIA

M.Sc. (Physics / Applied Physics) / Post-B.Sc. (Hons) in Optics and Optoelectronics / Radio Physics and Electronics.
Integrated Ph.D. Programme at IISER IISER. Thiruvananthapuram.

B.Sc. (Physics) or B.E. / B.Tech. in any discipline.
M.Sc. Programme at HRI.

B.Sc. (Physics) or B.E./B.Tech. degree in any discipline
HRI is starting a new M.Sc. programme in Physics from 2017. The Integrated Ph.D. programme in Physics at HRI is discontinued from 2017. It has been declared as a National Eligibility Test by Science and Engineering Research Board.

References 

Standardised tests in India